Illawarra Stingrays FC are a soccer team based in the Illawarra, New South Wales. They compete in the NSW National Premier Leagues Women’s or highest state level tier of women’s soccer within Football NSW. The club was founded in 2006 and is a member based association.

Foundation 
The Illawarra Stingrays were developed through a partnership between the Illawarra Junior Soccer Association (IJSA) and the Illawarra Women’s Soccer Association (IWSA) in 2006 to promote and develop elite female football in the area.

Although the Illawarra Women's Soccer Association (IWSA) was merged to become part of Football South Coast, the Illawarra Stingrays remained independent as the recognised entity in the Illawarra to represent elite level women's football.

Colours and badge
The primary club colour of Illawarra Stingrays is pink, which represents that the club is a women's only club. The secondary club colour is sky blue, with additional contrasting colours of navy blue and white.

The Illawarra Stingray logo features a stingray and a football set over the ray's tail.

Honours
NSW National Premier Leagues Women’s regular season
League Champions: 2009 (winning 6 -1 against Macarthur Rams), 2010 (winning 2 -0 against Inter Lions)  and 2011 NSW State League Women's
Minor Premiers: 2009 2010  2011 NSW State League Women's 

Runners Up: 2013 NSW State League Women's 
Under 17s Premiers: 2014 NSW National Premier Leagues Women’s
Preseason Cup: 2014  2015 NSW National Premier Leagues Women’s

Home Ground
The home ground of the Illawarra Stingrays is JJ Kelly park on a sub-leasing arrangement with another club. The club have been actively campaigning to be granted a home ground by their local council.

Representative Players
The Illawarra Stingrays are a strong development team and have supported the Matildas, Junior Matildas, State Representatives and W League players, including:

 Margaux Chauvet – Western Sydney Wanderers FC (A-League Women)
 Caitlin Cooper – Matildas, Western Sydney Wanderers FC (A-League Women)
 Erica Halloway  – Western Sydney Wanderers FC (A-League Women)
 Michelle Heyman – Matildas, Canberra United in the A-League Women. 2007 Leading goal-scorer for the Illawarra Stingrays in the FNSW Super League competition and club player of the year; 2009 Golden Boot in the FNSW Women's Premier League and Player of the Year; 2010 leading goal-scorer for Illawarra Stingrays.
 Danika Matos – Western Sydney Wanderers FC (A-League Women)
 Chloe Middleton – Western Sydney Wanderers FC (A-League Women)

Other
The Illawarra Stingrays played the Australia women's national soccer team in 2016 in an Olympic qualifying preparation match. Michelle Heyman and Caitlin Cooper were both in the Matildas squad that played against their local team.

References 

Soccer leagues in New South Wales
South
Women's soccer clubs in Australia